Elizaveta Sergeyevna Golubeva (née Kazelina;born 19 September 1996) is a Russian speed skater, bronze medalist in single distance at the 2016 World Single Distance Speed Skating Championships. Kazelina is Master of Sports of Russia (2015). Her coaches are her parents Olga and Sergey. Her twin brother Mikhail Kazelin is also a speed skater.

Career

Personal records

World Cup results

Podiums

Overall rankings

Personal life
Elizaveta was married to Kirill Golubev, a former speed skater, in April 2020. She subsequently took the name "Golubev".

References

External links

1996 births
Living people
People from Kolomna
Russian female speed skaters
Olympic speed skaters of Russia
Speed skaters at the 2012 Winter Youth Olympics
Speed skaters at the 2022 Winter Olympics
World Single Distances Speed Skating Championships medalists
Twin sportspeople
Russian twins
Sportspeople from Moscow Oblast
20th-century Russian women
21st-century Russian women